Jean Ducret (born 20 November 1887, 19 November 1975) was a French international footballer. He played as a midfielder and played for five teams, most notably Olympique Lillois and Stade Français. Ducret was one of the national team's first-ever permanent captains having served in the role 13 times in 20 appearances from 1910 to 1914. Ducret also scored three goals for the team, which included his first-ever against Italy in a 6–2 defeat in May 1910.

References 

1887 births
1975 deaths
Sportspeople from Suresnes
French footballers
France international footballers
Association football midfielders
Olympique Lillois players
Footballers from Hauts-de-Seine